Eudorylas kowarzi is a species of fly in the family Pipunculidae.

Distribution
Belgium, Germany, Great Britain, Croatia, Hungary, Poland, Slovakia, Netherlands.

References

Pipunculidae
Insects described in 1897
Diptera of Europe
Taxa named by Theodor Becker